is a municipality in Nordland county, Norway. It is part of the Helgeland traditional region. The administrative centre of the municipality is the village of Trofors. There are several other villages including Fallmoen, Leiren, Majavatn, and Strendene. European route E6 highway and the Nordland Line run through the municipality from south to north.

The  municipality is the 37th largest by area out of the 356 municipalities in Norway. Grane is the 302nd most populous municipality in Norway with a population of 1,461.

General information
The municipality of Grane was established on 1 July 1927 when it was separated from the large municipality of Vefsn. Initially, Grane had 1,746 residents. The municipal boundaries have not changed since then.

Name
The municipality (originally the parish) is named after the old Grane farm ("Grane" 1661), since the first church was built there in 1860. The name Grane is pronounced with a long a and short n, which is not palatalized. It is seemingly a simple and plain name, but many questions arise regarding both valid meanings for the word and the spoken forms it takes. The spoken form is most peculiar. It is distinct from other genuine old farm names in the area in that it is uninflected, with no definite form and consequently no distinct case (neither dative nor genitive). It is said short and crisp, regardless of what speech context it is found in. 

It seems to be a farm name with a grammatical form presuming a standard only found among farms cleared in the Middle Ages, and likely around the 12th century. But the Grane farm was not cleared before the mid-17th century and there is nothing to suggest a prior settlement. Thus we find a basic disparity without any easy explanation. Farm names sometimes follow environmental descriptions given in the vernacular of the time, but it is quite difficult to see what environmental aspect would yield the name form of "Grane" in the speech of the 17th century.

One possible explanation is that those who cleared the farm around 1650 simply borrowed the name from another known place in the country. It is not doubtful that those who cleared the farm came from Åneset in Vefsn. But this does not preclude the notion that the name may have its roots elsewhere. Sagas say it stems from Jämtland (Sweden). In Nord-Trøndelag there are three settlements for which one finds the farm name "Gran" (of course pronounced without the final 'e'). Outside the northern regions, the farm name is found only in Askvoll in Vestlandet. The name of that farm is also written Grane, and the pronunciation ([gra:nə]) is exactly the same. But it is rather insensible that the name could have been borrowed from there.

Therefore, if the name actually is a local development in the Old Norse speech forms of the Middle Ages—there was surely quite a significant farm settlement in the central valleys of Vefsn before the plague—it was unlikely to have been used as the name for a farm. Rather it would have had to have been so well entrenched in its ancient speech form that it held over from the times of pestilence and Black Death when settlers were reduced to meager numbers. This is possible, but still mere conjecture.

In the matter of the name's valid meaning, it is obvious to assume that it has its origins in the tree name 'gran' (spruce). This should designate a place where spruces grow. This is an unlikely explanation for a name with local origins in the Middle Ages and makes little sense. Even though many spruces currently grow in that vicinity, recent pollen studies show that spruce forests came surprisingly late to that stretch of land. They were not present before the 13th to 14th centuries and it took several hundred years after that for spruce forest to proliferate in the Ner-Vefsn and Majavatnet settlements. Spruce trees were not likely characteristic of the Grane area in the Middle Ages.

Researchers into municipal naming practices have concluded that the stem 'gran', found in a series of names nationwide, cannot have its source in the environmental connection to spruce timber. At the root is certainly an Old Norse word which must have denoted something 'sharp', and which is now extant in only a few Norse dialects with traditional meanings. Used in a place name, the stem would probably signify 'something which protrudes up from the landscape.' 

Another theory is that the name derives from the South Sámi word kråane, which means 'corner' or 'crook', referring to the bending and curving of the Vefsna river in the area. This is also the point where the river flowing westward from Hattfjelldal changes direction and turns north towards the Vefsnfjord.

Coat of arms
The coat of arms was granted on 18 July 1980. The official blazon is "Argent, a salmon haurient azure". This means the arms have a field (background) that has a tincture of argent which means it is commonly colored white, but if it is made out of metal, then silver is used. The charge is a leaping salmon. This was chosen as a symbol of the rich salmon rivers Vefsna and Svenningelva that run through the municipality. There are many small waterfalls where jumping salmon can be observed in the summer. The arms were designed by P. Lakfors.

Churches
The Church of Norway has one parish within the municipality of Grane. It is part of the Indre Helgeland prosti (deanery) in the Diocese of Sør-Hålogaland.

Geography
The municipality is located in the southern part of the county, along the border with Trøndelag. Grane includes many lakes including Fiskelausvatnet, Gåsvatnet, Jengelvatnet, Majavatnet, Mellingsvatnet, Nedre Fiplingvatnet, Sefrivatnet, and Storsvenningvatnet. The main river Vefsna also runs through the valley. There are two national parks that are partially located in Grane: Børgefjell National Park and Lomsdal–Visten National Park.

Government
All municipalities in Norway, including Grane, are responsible for primary education (through 10th grade), outpatient health services, senior citizen services, unemployment and other social services, zoning, economic development, and municipal roads. The municipality is governed by a municipal council of elected representatives, which in turn elect a mayor.  The municipality falls under the Alstahaug District Court and the Hålogaland Court of Appeal.

Municipal council
The municipal council of Grane is made up of 17 representatives that are elected to four year terms. The party breakdown of the council is as follows:

Mayor
The mayors of Grane (incomplete list):
2019–present: Ellen Schjølberg (Sp)
2003-2019: Bjørn Ivar Lamo (Ap)

Notable people 
 Gustav Kappfjell (1913 in Majavatn – 1999) a Southern Sámi reindeer herder, hunter, farmer, poet and joiker

References

External links
Municipal fact sheet from Statistics Norway 

 
Municipalities of Nordland
Valleys of Nordland
1927 establishments in Norway